Mallakhamba or mallakhamb is a traditional sport, originating from the Indian subcontinent, in which a gymnast performs aerial yoga or gymnastic postures and wrestling grips in concert with a vertical stationary or hanging wooden pole, cane, or rope. The word "mallakhamb" also refers to the pole used in the sport. The pole is usually made from sheesham (Indian rosewood) polished with castor oil. Three popular versions of Mallakhamb are practiced using a sheesham pole, cane, or rope.

The name Mallakhamb derives from the terms malla, meaning wrestler, and khamb, which means a pole. Literally meaning "wrestling pole", the term refers to a traditional training implement used by wrestlers.

On April 9, 2013, the Indian state of Madhya Pradesh declared Mallakhamba the state sport. , more than 20 other states in India have followed suit.

History 
Chandraketugarh pottery (Dated 2nd century BCE - 1st century CE) with narrative figures carved on them show a couple exhibiting gymnastics by hanging on a pole like structure in the shape of a T which is held by another person. In 7th century CE, Chinese Buddhist pilgrim Xuanzhang provides evidence of pole climbing of the pillar cult which he witnessed at Prayagraj, he states that Hindu ascetics climbed the top of a pole situated at Prayagraj clinging onto it with one hand and one foot while other hand and foot stretched out in the air and watched sunset with their heads turned right as it set which indicates a solar rite. The earliest literary known mention of Mallakhamb is in the 1135 CE Sanskrit classic Manasollasa, written by a Western Chalukya king Someshvara III. A Rajput painting from 1610 CE shows athletes performing various acrobatics, including pole climbing while dancing to Raga Desahka. A Mughal painting from 1670 depicts wrestlers or athletes practicing club swinging, weightlifting, and pole climbing similar to Mallakhamb. The art form since remained dormant until it was given a new lease on life by Balambhatta Dada Deodhar, the teacher of Peshwa Baji Rao II. During the first half of the 19th century, Lakshmibai, the Rani of Jhansi learned Mallakhamb with her childhood friends Nana Saheb and Tantia Tope.

Mallakhamb as a Competitive Sport was first time Developed by the Mallakhamb Federation of India in January 1981 and the rules and regulations were also introduced for the first time in the First National Championships held from 28 to 29 January 1981. 

Competitive Mallakhamb at the national level first made its appearance in 1958 at the National Gymnastics Championships (NGCs) held at the Pahadganj Stadium, Delhi, India. The Gymnastics Federation of India (GFI) proposed to recognize the game and include it in subsequent NGCs. The first National Mallakhamb Championships were held in 1962 at Gwalior, Madhya Pradesh, as part of the NGCs. Around 1968, the game was introduced in the All-India Inter-University Gymnastics Championships. The National Mallakhamb Championships were organized annually by the GFI until 1976. In 1977, these Mallakhamb Championships were removed from the GFI, and no major championship games were held until 1980.

Bamshankar Joshi and other Mallakhamb enthusiasts at Ujjain, Madhya Pradesh, founded an All-India Level Organization named the Mallakhamb Federation of India. The first All-India  National Mallakhamb Championships were organized by the New Sports Association from January 28 to 29, 1981, at Ujjain, Madhya Pradesh. The event brought in representatives from all over India; they participated in these championships and this organisation has been registered on 7 June 1984 as Mallakhamb  Federation wide Registration No.13752. The National Mallakhamb Championships have since been organized by different state associations affiliated to this Federation.

Competitively, there are several versions but three variations of Mallakhamb sport are in practice since 1937:

 Pole Mallakhamb
 Hanging Mallakhamb
 Rope Mallakhamb

All are practiced by both men and women, though Pole Mallakhamb is more commonly practiced by men and boys, and Rope Mallakhamb by women and girls.
All Mallakhamb competitions are organized under the rules made by the Mallakhamb Federation of India, and 28 states are affiliated to the Federation. Himani Uttam Parab won Gold Medal in Rope Long set in the first World Mallakhamb Championship 2019.

Variations and specifications

Pole Mallakhamb 
In this variation, a vertical wooden pole made of teak wood or sheesham is fixed to the ground. The pole is smeared with castor oil, which helps to minimize excessive friction. Participants perform various acrobatic feats and poses while hanging on the pole. Wrestlers mount, dismount, and utilize the pole for various complex calisthenics designed to develop their grip, stamina, and strength in the arms, legs, and upper body.

There are a number of pillars, although the most common is a free-standing upright pole, some eight to ten inches in diameter, planted into the ground.

The specifications of Pole Mallakhamb are as follows:

Hanging Mallakhamb 
This type of Mallakhamb is similar to Pole Mallakhamb, but it uses a wooden pole shorter than the standard pole in Pole Mallakhamb. The pole is hung with hooks and a chain, leaving a gap between the ground and the bottom of the Mallakhamb.

The specifications of Hanging Mallakhamb are as follows:

Rope Mallakhamb 
In this variation, the participant performs exercises while hanging on a rope suspended from a support at the top. The rope is caught by the performer in the gap between the big toe and the second toe, along with one or both hands. After climbing upwards on the rope, the performer ties the rope around the body through a sequence of steps. The performer then reaches various positions called Udi ("to fly"), some of which are imitations of standard asana.

Rope Mallakhamb was historically performed on a cane, but due to the lack of good cane, a cotton rope is used. Performers are expected to perform various exercises without knotting the rope in any way.

The specifications of Rope Mallakhamb are as follows:

Official international organizations  
 Vishwa Mallakhamb Federation (VMF)
 Mallakhamb Confederation of World (MCW)
 Asian Mallakhamb Federation (AMF)
 South Asian Mallakhamb Federation (SAMF)

Official Indian mallakhamb sport national organizations 
Mallakhamb Federation which was widely known as Mallakhamb Federation of India MFI before its registration on 7 June 1984 with Registration No. 13752 in Ujjain, M.P.
Mallakhamb Federation is affiliated with Vishwa Mallakhamb Federation, Mallakhamb Confederation of World MCW, Asian Mallakhamb Federation AMF, South Asian Mallakhamb Federation SAMF.

See also
 Bo-taoshi
 Chinese pole
 Kalaripayattu
 Malla-yuddha
 Pole dance

References

Further reading
 Mallakhamb: An Investigation Into the Indian Physical Practice of Rope and Pole Mallakhamb by Jon Burtt, Edith Cowan University, 2010.

External links 

 Mallakhamb India website 

 https://web.archive.org/web/20101210030821/http://library.thinkquest.org/11372/data/mallakhamb.htm
https://www.news18.com/news/sports/india-win-team-event-at-mallakhamb-world-championship-2039549.html
https://indianexpress.com/photos/india-news/india-hosts-first-ever-world-mallakhamb-championship-in-mumbai-5590757/

Gymnastics
Gymnastics apparatus
Exercise equipment
Traditional sports of India
Sports originating in India
Culture of Maharashtra
Sport in Maharashtra
Wrestling in India
Cultural history of Maharashtra